In military terms, 114th Division or 114th Infantry Division may refer to:

 114th Armed Police Mobile Division, a former unit of the Chinese Army, currently a unit of the People's Armed Police
 114th Jäger Division, a unit of the German Army
 114th Division (Imperial Japanese Army), a unit of the Imperial Japanese Army

See also
 114th Squadron (disambiguation)

sl:Seznam divizij po zaporednih številkah (100. - 149.)#114. divizija